MD5, MD 5, or MD-5 may refer to:

MD5 cryptographic hash function
Maryland's 5th congressional district
Maryland Route 5
MD-5 (Star Wars), a droid in the Star Wars saga
MD-5, a team from the  Australian web series Meta Runner